Aandu is a village in Kohila Parish, Rapla County in northwestern Estonia.

References

Villages in Rapla County